Philippe Daniel Garner (born March 1949) is a British expert on photography-

Garner joined Sotheby's Auctioneers and in 1971 took charge of the Art Nouveau and Art Deco department. The same year he held the first specialist auction of photography in the United Kingdom. After thirty years he joined Phillips, de Pury & Luxembourg in July 2002 with the position of Worldwide Director of Photographs and 20th and 21st Century Design.

He joined Christie's in 2004 as their international head of photographs and 20th century decorative arts and design. He retired from Christie's on 31 May 2016.

Garner has written extensively about 20th century photography and curated a number of exhibitions.

In 2011 he was given the Royal Photographic Society's Award for Outstanding Service to Photography and in 2004 he was awarded an Honorary Fellowship of The Society.

Selected publications
Cecil Beaton. Jonathan Cape, 1994.
Cecil Beaton: The Dandy Photographer. British Council, 1998.
John Cowan: Through The Light Barrier. Schirmer/Mosel, 1999.
Guy Bourdin. Gallimard, 2004.

References

External links
Interview with Philippe Garner, International Head of 20th Century Decorative Art & Design
Photographic portrait of Philippe Garner in the National Portrait Gallery.
Phillipe Garner discusses the photographs of Sebastião Salgado’s GENESIS PROJECT. 

Living people
1949 births
French art dealers